The 2019–20 Basketball Cup is the 52nd edition of the Netherlands' national basketball cup tournament. This was the first season the competition was known as Basketball Cup instead of NBB Cup, as the national federation changed its name from NBB to Basketball Nederland. On 12 March 2020, competition was suspended as a result of the COVID-19 pandemic. This decision was made prior to the final, which was to be played by Donar and Aris Leeuwarden. 

On 20 December 2020, it was announced that the final would not be played and no champions were named for the first time in the cup's history.

Format
In the first, second and third round teams from the Dutch second, third and fourth division participate. From the fourth round, teams from the Dutch Basketball League (DBL) enter the competition. Quarter- and semi-finals are played in a two-legged format. When a team form a tier lower than the DBL played a DBL team, one win is sufficient for the latter to advance to the next round.

Bracket

Final
On 19 February 2020, the DBL announced the final was to be played in MartiniPlaza in Groningen on 29 March.

See also
2019–20 Dutch Basketball League

References

NBB Cup
Cup